The 2015 Evian Championship was played 10–13 September at the Evian Resort Golf Club in Évian-les-Bains, France. It was the 22nd Evian Championship (the first 19 played as the Evian Masters), and the third as a major championship on the LPGA Tour. The event was televised by Golf Channel and NBC Sports in the United States and Sky Sports in the United Kingdom. Lydia Ko won her first major championship, becoming the youngest major winner, at age 18, and shooting the lowest final round, 63, to win a major.

Field
The field for the tournament is set at 120, and most earn exemptions based on past performance on the Ladies European Tour, the LPGA Tour, or with a high ranking in the Women's World Golf Rankings.

There are 12 exemption categories for the 2015 Evian Championship.

1. The top 40 in the Women's World Golf Rankings, as of 4 August 2015
Baek Kyu-jung (4,12), Chella Choi (4,12), Chun In-gee (3), Paula Creamer (2,7,12), Shanshan Feng (4,5,7,12), Sandra Gal (12), Julieta Granada (12), Brooke Henderson (4), Jang Ha-na (7,12), Cristie Kerr (4,12), Kim Hyo-joo (2,4,7,12), Kim Sei-young (4,12), Ko Jin-young, Lydia Ko (4,5,7,12), Jessica Korda (12), Brittany Lang (12), Minjee Lee (4,12), Mirim Lee (4,12), Stacy Lewis (12), Brittany Lincicome (3,7,12), Azahara Muñoz (5,12), Anna Nordqvist (4,7,12), Inbee Park (2,3,4,7,12), Suzann Pettersen (2,4,6,7,12), Gerina Piller (12), Morgan Pressel (12), Ryu So-yeon (5,12), Lizette Salas (12), Jenny Shin (12), Angela Stanford (12), Lexi Thompson (4,7,12), Karrie Webb (2,7,12), Michelle Wie (12), Amy Yang (4,12)
Ahn Sun-ju, Choi Na-yeon (4,7,12), Lee Bo-mee, Lee Jung-min, Teresa Lu, Jiyai Shin (2) did not play

2. Active past champions
Laura Davies, Natalie Gulbis, Juli Inkster (12), Ai Miyazato (12)

3. Winners of the 2015 majors (2015 ANA Inspiration, 2015 KPMG Women's PGA Championship, 2015 U.S. Women's Open, 2015 Women's British Open)
All players already qualified in other categories.

4. LPGA Tour winners since 2014 Evian
M. J. Hur (7,12), Christina Kim (12), Lee Mi-hyang (12), Lee-Anne Pace (5,12), Kris Tamulis (12)

5. Ladies European Tour (LET) winners since 2014 Evian
Beth Allen (6), Rebecca Artis (6), Hannah Burke, Connie Chen, Ssu-chia Cheng, Nicole Broch Larsen, Xi Yu Lin (12), Gwladys Nocera (6), Su-Hyun Oh, Melissa Reid (6)
Christel Boeljon (12) did not play

6. The top 5 on the LET Order of Merit, as of commitment date

7. Top 10 and ties from the 2014 Evian Championship
Moriya Jutanugarn (12), Mariajo Uribe (12)

8. 2015 U.S. Women's Amateur champion
Hannah O'Sullivan (a)

9. 2015 British Ladies Amateur champion
Céline Boutier (a)

10. Evian invitations (four)
Mathilda Cappeliez (a), Agathe Laisné (a), Leona Maguire (a), Albane Valenzuela (a)

11. Evian pre-qualifiers (two)
Emily Kristine Pedersen, Klára Spilková

12. LPGA Tour money list, as of commitment date
Marina Alex, Amy Anderson, Katie Burnett, Carlota Ciganda, Jacqui Concolino, Austin Ernst, Jodi Ewart Shadoff, Jaye Marie Green, Mina Harigae, Caroline Hedwall, María Hernández, Wei-Ling Hsu, Charley Hull, Karine Icher, Eun-Hee Ji, Tiffany Joh, Ariya Jutanugarn, Danielle Kang, Kim Kaufman, Sarah Kemp, In-Kyung Kim, SooBin Kim, Joanna Klatten, P.K. Kongkraphan, Candie Kung, Min Seo Kwak, Alison Lee, Ilhee Lee, Min Lee, Meena Lee, Pernilla Lindberg, Mo Martin, Caroline Masson, Catriona Matthew, Maria McBride, Sydnee Michaels, Mika Miyazato, Belén Mozo, Haru Nomura, Ryann O'Toole, Jane Park, Park Hee-young, Sadena Parks, Pornanong Phatlum, Beatriz Recari, Paula Reto, Alena Sharp, Kelly Shon, Sarah Jane Smith, Jennifer Song, Thidapa Suwannapura, Kelly Tan, Yani Tseng, Ayako Uehara, Alison Walshe, Sakura Yokomine, Yoo Sun-young
Perrine Delacour, Lee Jee-young, Yueer Cindy Feng did not play

Past champions in the field

Nationalities in the field

Course

Source:

Round summaries

First round
Thursday, 10 September 2015

Second round
Friday, 11 September 2015

Third round
Saturday, 12 September 2015

Final round
Sunday, 13 September 2015

Lydia Ko birdied five holes on the back-nine and shot a round of 63 for a six-shot win over Lexi Thompson and her first career major championship. With the win Ko became the youngest winner of a LPGA major, and the youngest major champion in golf since Young Tom Morris won the 1868 Open Championship. Her closing round of 63 was a record lowest final round in the history of women's golf majors.

Scorecard
Final round

Cumulative tournament scores, relative to par
Source:

References

External links

Coverage on the Ladies European Tour's official site
Coverage on the LPGA Tour's official site

The Evian Championship
Golf tournaments in France
Evian Championship
Evian Championship
Evian Championship